The Crooked Trail is a 1936 American Western film directed by S. Roy Luby.

Plot

Cast 
Johnny Mack Brown as Jim Blake
Lucile Browne as Helen Carter
John Merton as Harve Tarlton
Charles King as Lanning
Ted Adams as Estaban Solano
John Van Pelt as Tex, a Miner
Ed Cassidy as Grimby, a Miner
Horace Murphy as Carter

External links 

1936 films
1936 Western (genre) films
1930s English-language films
American black-and-white films
American Western (genre) films
Films directed by S. Roy Luby
Films with screenplays by George H. Plympton
1930s American films